The Sausalito Yacht Club (SYC) in the city of Sausalito, California on San Francisco Bay was founded in 1942 to promote yachting, both racing and cruising.

History

The seven founding members of the Sausalito Yacht Club, all under the age of 20, were already junior members of other yacht clubs, but thought they could do better themselves. The founders conceived and established the new club on December 31, 1942. The time was right. World War II had called many of the older, local boat owners to Europe or the Pacific. Before heading off to war, they trusted their boats to the care of the new club, whose oldest member was three months short of his seventeenth birthday.

The club had several names in the first few days until Sausalito Yacht Club became the obvious choice. A mood of teenage rebellion was reflected in a provision of the first bylaws: no one could join the club who was older than the oldest founding member. Later, the maximum age limit was raised, although it was not abandoned until 1953.

Originally the club meetings were held in members' homes, but they soon adopted the Officer's saloon of the steam schooner, Santa Barbara. Club meetings had to be scheduled at low tide due to the fact that the Santa Barbara was beached in mud at the south end of the Sausalito Yacht Harbor. Later on the members rented the former clubhouse of the San Francisco Yacht Club on the Sausalito waterfront (future home of the Trident, then the Horizons restaurants). After the end of World War II, the club moved to a wood-frame building at the south end of the yacht harbor. A small boat hoist and dry boat storage helped the club to grow and host regattas for the Small Boat Racing Association (SBRA). The club decided it needed a permanent clubhouse, and signed a lease with J. H. Madden Sr. of Madden and Lewis Corp. for a site on the water at the former Northwestern Pacific passenger train railhead for the Sausalito to San Francisco ferry, which had been abandoned after the completion of the Golden Gate Bridge in May 1937. The club called on the talents and labor of members to design and build the clubhouse. Club members, along with a pile driver and operator supplied by Madden and Lewis, drove all of the piles for the clubhouse over the weekend of December 6–7, 1958. Member Ted Boutmy designed the clubhouse and a contractor was hired to build it. The clubhouse was completed and dedicated on September 24, 1960.

Membership
Most of the members of the Sausalito Yacht Club are from Sausalito or neighboring areas in Marin County, San Francisco or the East Bay, but the club has a sizable number of members from elsewhere in the United States as well as foreign countries. Club bylaws require that a major percentage of the members of the club own a boat. SYC is a member club of the Pacific Inter-Club Yacht Association (PICYA). SYC offers reciprocal club privileges to visiting members of many recognized yacht clubs from around the world.

Yacht racing
The club organizes and manages Sausalito Yacht Club races as well as races for the Yacht Racing Association of San Francisco Bay (YRA) and other organizations. SYC provides leadership for PICYA events on many occasions.

In 1991, SYC hosted the U.S. Junior Women's Single-handed Championship for the Nancy Leiter Clagett Memorial Trophy. In 2003 SYC hosted the Challenge Series of IACC design America's Cup boats, and in 2008 SYC hosted the Ida Lewis U.S. Junior Women's Double-handed Championship.

Cruising
The club hosts monthly sail and power boat cruises to destinations in the Bay, Delta and blue water between Tomales and Monterey. It also sometimes organizes charter cruises to more far-flung destinations such as Tahiti and Croatia.

Youth sailing program
In keeping with the tradition of the founding members, the SYC sponsors a youth sailing program open to members and non-members, providing small craft such as Optimist prams and Lasers. Varsity and junior varsity sailing programs welcome students from local high schools. During the summer, the club conducts a junior sailing camp for new sailors as well as for those who have sailed previously and are interested in racing.

Squeegee Weegee Gazette
The Squeegee Weegee Gazette is the official publication of the Sausalito Yacht Club. It is published monthly during the summer and bimonthly during the winter months.

Photo gallery

References

External links
 Sausalito Yacht Club home page
 Yacht Racing Association of San Francisco Bay
 Pacific Inter-Club Yacht Association

1942 establishments in California
America's Cup yacht clubs
Buildings and structures in Marin County, California
Sailing in California
Sports clubs established in 1942
Sports in Marin County, California
Sports in the San Francisco Bay Area
Yacht clubs in the United States